Abdullah Dor Mohammad Balideh Baloushi (born 14 February 1970) is a Qatari football referee who has been a full international referee for FIFA.

Balideh became a FIFA referee in 2005. He served as a referee in the 2010 and 2014 FIFA World Cup qualifiers, as well as the Pan Arab Games.

References

External links 

 
 

1970 births
Living people
Qatari football referees
Qatari people of Baloch descent